The 1999 Pattaya Women's Open, also known as the Volvo Women's Open, was a women's tennis tournament played on outdoor hard courts in Pattaya, Thailand. It was part of Tier IV of the 1999 WTA Tour. It was the 9th edition of the tournament and was held from 15 November through 22 November 1999, making it the final tournament of the year. Qualifier Magdalena Maleeva won the singles title.

Entrants

Seeds

Other entrants
The following players received wildcards into the singles main draw:
  Åsa Carlsson
  Benjamas Sangaram
  Joannette Kruger

The following players received wildcards into the doubles main draw:
  Benjamas Sangaram /  Iroda Tulyaganova

The following players received entry from the singles qualifying draw:

  Iroda Tulyaganova
  Tina Križan
  Magdalena Maleeva
  Olga Barabanschikova

The following players received entry from the doubles qualifying draw:

  Janet Lee /  Wynne Prakusya

Finals

Singles

 Magdalena Maleeva defeated  Anne Kremer, 4–6, 6–1, 6–2
 This was Maleeva's seventh WTA title and her first since 1995.

Doubles

 Émilie Loit /  Åsa Carlsson defeated  Evgenia Koulikovskaya /  Patricia Wartusch, 6–1, 6–4

References

External links
 ITF tournament edition details
 Tournament draws

 
 WTA Tour
 in women's tennis
Tennis, WTA Tour, Pattaya Women's Open
Tennis, WTA Tour, Pattaya Women's Open

Tennis, WTA Tour, Pattaya Women's Open